This is a list of albums released by Impact Wrestling.

NWA: TNA The Music, Vol. 1 

NWA: TNA The Music, Vol. 1 is the first of two CDs released from NWA: TNA, in early 2003. These CDs were not available in stores, and instead were sold at merchandise stalls at the weekly Wednesday night pay-per-views, and on the TNA website. All of the songs were written and composed by producer, Dale Oliver. This was succeeded by a second album later that year, following the same exclusivity trend as this volume.

The themes of A.J. Styles and Jeff Jarrett were later re-released on 3rd Degree Burns: The Music of TNA Wrestling Vol. I album, the first TNA album release after the company disassociated itself with the National Wrestling Alliance.

Track listing

NWA: TNA The Music, Vol. 2 

NWA: TNA The Music, Vol. 2 is the second CD released from NWA: TNA, in late 2003. Like NWA: TNA The Music, Vol. 1, it was not available in stores, and instead were sold at merchandise stalls at the weekly Wednesday night pay-per-views, and on the TNA website. All of the tracks were composed by producer Dale Oliver.

Track listing

3rd Degree Burns: The Music of TNA Wrestling, Vol. I 

3rd Degree Burns: The Music of TNA Wrestling Vol. I is the first CD released after the company became known as Total Nonstop Action Wrestling – and third CD release overall. The album was released on November 21, 2006, featuring the entrance music of TNA wrestlers, as well as "prequel" tracks from the Victory Road 2006 PPV.

Track listing

Meltdown: The Music of TNA Wrestling Volume 2 

Meltdown: The Music of TNA Wrestling Volume 2 is the fourth CD released from Total Nonstop Action Wrestling on November 20, 2007, featuring the entrance music of TNA wrestlers.

Track listing

Emergence: The Music of TNA Wrestling 

Emergence: The Music of TNA Wrestling is the fifth CD released from Total Nonstop Action Wrestling.

Track listing

Q4 

Q4 is the sixth album released from Total Nonstop Action Wrestling on November 21, 2012. It is a digital release and has not been released physically (CD).

Track listing

Black 

Black is the seventh album released from Total Nonstop Action Wrestling on December 27, 2012. It is a digital release and has not been released physically (CD).

Track listing

Delirium 

Delirium is the eighth album released from Total Nonstop Action Wrestling on May 3, 2013. It is a digital release and has not been released physically (CD).

Track listing

Deliver

Deliver is the ninth album released from Total Nonstop Action Wrestling on November 18, 2013. It is a digital release and has not been released physically (CD).

Track listing

Evolution XIV 

Evolution XIV is the tenth album released from Total Nonstop Action Wrestling on April 24, 2014. It is a digital release and has not been released physically (CD).

Track listing

TOI 

TOI is the eleventh album released from Total Nonstop Action Wrestling on September 22, 2014. It is a digital release and has not been released physically (CD).

Track listing

Rawk On! 

Rawk On! is the twelfth album released from Total Nonstop Action Wrestling on February 13, 2015. It is a digital release and has not been released physically (CD).

Track listing

POP (Past or Present) 

POP (Past or Present) is the thirteenth album released from Total Nonstop Action Wrestling on December 28, 2015. It is a digital release and has not been released physically (CD).

Track listing

Blue 

Blue is the fourteenth album released from Impact Wrestling on May 23, 2017. It is a digital release and has not been released physically (CD).

Track listing

Green 

Green is the fifteenth album released from Impact Wrestling on May 23, 2017. It is a digital release and has not been released physically (CD).

Track listing

Red 

Red is the sixteenth album released from Impact Wrestling on May 23, 2017. It is a digital release and has not been released physically (CD).

Track listing

DV8 

DV8 is the seventeenth album released from Global Force Wrestling on September 13, 2017. It is a digital release and has not been released physically (CD).

Track listing

See also

Impact Wrestling Music
Music in professional wrestling

References

External links
 Impact Wrestling official website
 

2000s compilation albums
2000s soundtrack albums
Rock compilation albums
Professional wrestling albums
Professional wrestling-related lists